Musa Dogon Yaro (27 February 1945 – August 2008) was a Nigerian sprinter. Musa competed in the men's 400 metres at the 1968 Summer Olympics.

Personal life

Dogonyaro attended Biola University, where he was a football and track athlete. He later earned a doctorate degree in physical education. He worked at the Kaduna State Sports Council and was later director of Sports development at the Federal Ministry of Sports.

He was a father of four children.

References

External links

1945 births
2008 deaths
Athletes (track and field) at the 1968 Summer Olympics
Athletes (track and field) at the 1970 British Commonwealth Games
Athletes (track and field) at the 1972 Summer Olympics
Athletes (track and field) at the 1974 British Commonwealth Games
Nigerian male sprinters
Olympic athletes of Nigeria
Place of birth missing
Commonwealth Games competitors for Nigeria
20th-century Nigerian people